The Pacific flatbill (Rhynchocyclus pacificus) is a species of bird in the family Tyrannidae. It is found in Colombia and Ecuador.

Its natural habitat is subtropical or tropical moist lowland forests.

References

Pacific flatbill
Birds of the Tumbes-Chocó-Magdalena
Pacific flatbill
Taxonomy articles created by Polbot